Fene may also refer to:
 Fene, Galicia— a municipality in the province of A Coruña, in the autonomous community of Galicia, in northwestern Spain
 FENE, the finitely extensible nonlinear elastic model of a long-chained polymer
 Fene, the Hungarian demon of illness